Dewayne "D. J." White, Jr. (born August 31, 1986) is an American former professional basketball player, who was selected in the first round of the 2008 NBA Draft. He spent the majority of his career playing overseas.

High school and college career
A Hillcrest High School standout, White led all freshmen in the Big Ten Conference in scoring during his freshman season with the Indiana Hoosiers. He was named by Rivals.com as a Freshman All-American, and was named a 5-star recruit by Scout.com. He was also selected as the Big Ten Freshman of the Year. In 2008, he was named Big Ten Player of the Year and to the First Team All-Big Ten. He was also named Second Team All-American in 2008.

College statistics

|-
| style="text-align:left;"| 2004–05
| style="text-align:left;"| Indiana
| 29 || 29 || 28.1 || .572 ||  || .709 || 4.9 || .8 || .5 || 2.2 || 13.3
|-
| style="text-align:left;"| 2005–06
| style="text-align:left;"| Indiana
| 5 || 3 || 17.8 || .528 ||  || .571 || 6.0 || 1.0 || .0 || .1.4 || 9.2
|-
| style="text-align:left;"| 2006–07
| style="text-align:left;"| Indiana
| 32 || 32 || 31.8 || .512 ||  || .685 || 7.3 || 1.3 || .9 || 2.3 || 13.8
|-
| style="text-align:left;"| 2007–08
| style="text-align:left;"| Indiana
| 33 || 33 || 33.5 || .605 || .333 || .689 || 10.3 || .8 || .8 || 1.6 || 17.4

|- class="sortbottom"
| style="text-align:center;" colspan="2"| Career
| 99 || 97 || 30.6 || .562 || .333 || .690 || 7.6 || .9 || .7 || 2.0 || 14.6

Professional career
White was drafted with the 29th pick of the 2008 NBA draft by the Detroit Pistons and traded the same day to the Seattle SuperSonics, who were relocating to Oklahoma City. White's rookie season was delayed when he had to undergo surgery on his jaw to remove a benign growth, causing him to miss the first five months of the season.  He finally made his professional debut for the Tulsa 66ers of the NBA D-League on March 18, 2009. In six games he played with Tulsa, he averaged 18.3 points and 7.2 rebounds per game. After that short stint, he was recalled by the Oklahoma City Thunder and made his NBA debut on April 5, 2009 against the Indiana Pacers. During his rookie season, White played in seven games for the Thunder and averaged 8.9 points and 4.6 rebounds.

In the 2009–10 season, White appeared in eight games with Oklahoma City, averaging 4.8 points and 1.9 rebounds, before requiring surgery in January to repair a fractured thumb. After recovering, White was once again assigned to the Tulsa 66ers on March 4, 2010. He was recalled just five days later on March 9 after averaging 23 points and 11 rebounds in four starts for Tulsa. On March 21, White received a standing ovation upon entering the contest during an away game against the Indiana Pacers in the state where he played in college. White scored six points and grabbed two rebounds in 10 minutes of playing time during the game.  White returned to the 66ers on April 7, 2010. For a total of 10 games he played for Tulsa that season, he averaged career-highs of 20.2 points and 11.1 rebounds in 39.2 minutes per game on the court. He even appeared in one NBA D-League playoff game for them, scoring 21 points, and having 5 rebounds and 4 assists.

For the beginning of the 2010–11 season, White was retained on the Thunder's 15-man roster, with the Thunder exercising its fourth-year contract option on White on October 25, 2010. On February 24, 2011, White and Morris Peterson were traded to the Charlotte Bobcats for Nazr Mohammed.

In September 2012, White signed with the Shanghai Sharks of China. On February 28, 2013, White signed a 10-day contract with the Boston Celtics. He signed a second 10-day contract with the Celtics on March 10, 2013. On March 20, 2013, White was signed to a multi-year contract by the Celtics.

On July 12, 2013, he was traded to the Brooklyn Nets as part of the blockbuster deal that brought Kevin Garnett and Paul Pierce to Brooklyn. He was subsequently waived by the Nets on July 18.

In September 2013, White joined the Chicago Bulls for their training camp. However, he was waived on October 26.

In November 2013, he signed with the Sichuan Blue Whales for the 2013–14 CBA season.

On March 21, 2014, he signed a 10-day contract with Charlotte Bobcats. On March 31, 2014, he signed a second 10-day contract with the Bobcats. On April 10, 2014, he signed with the Bobcats for the rest of the season.

On October 4, 2014, he signed a one-month deal with Laboral Kutxa Vitoria of the Liga ACB. On November 7, 2014, he parted ways with Laboral Kutxa after his contract expired. On November 25, 2014, he signed with the Fujian Sturgeons of China for the rest of the 2014–15 CBA season.

On July 7, 2015, White joined the Cleveland Cavaliers for the 2015 NBA Summer League. On August 26, 2015, he signed with Auxilium CUS Torino of Italy for the 2015–16 season. On July 22, 2016, he re-signed with Torino for one more season.

On July 8, 2017, White signed with the Turkish Basketball Super League club Gaziantep Basketbol. On December 6, 2017, he left Gaziantep and signed with the Turkish Basketball First League club Bahcesehir Basketbol.

In 2019, White joined Tofaş. He averaged 9.2 points, 2.8 rebounds and 1.3 assists per game. He re-signed with the team on August 22, 2020.

On August 15, 2022, he has announced his retirement from professional basketball.

Career statistics

NBA

Regular season

|-
| align="left" | 
| align="left" | Oklahoma City
| 7 || 0 || 18.6 || .520 || .000 || .769 || 4.6 || .9 || .4 || .7 || 8.9
|-
| align="left" | 
| align="left" | Oklahoma City
| 12 || 0 || 8.5 || .610 || .000 || .900 || 1.9 || .3 || .4 || .3 || 4.9
|-
| align="left" | 
| align="left" | Oklahoma City
| 23 || 0 || 9.5 || .462 || .000 || .500 || 2.2 || .2 || .3 || .3 || 2.8
|-
| align="left" | 
| align="left" | Charlotte
| 24 || 0 || 19.4 || .526 || .000 || .759 || 4.4 || .6 || .3 || .5 || 8.5
|-
| align="left" | 
| align="left" | Charlotte
| 58 || 11 || 18.9 || .493 || 1.000 || .705 || 3.6 || .8 || .3 || .4 || 6.8
|-
| align="left" | 
| align="left" | Boston
| 12 || 0 || 7.2 || .522 || .000 || .556 || 1.1 || .3 || .1 || .5 || 2.4
|-
| align="left" | 
| align="left" | Charlotte
| 2 || 0 || 5.0 || .000 || .000 || .000 || 1.0 || .0 || .5 || .0 || 0.0
|- class="sortbottom"
| style="text-align:left;"| Career
| style="text-align:left;"|
| 138 || 11 || 15.3 || .507 || .333 || .720 || 3.2 || .6 || .3 || .4 || 5.9

Playoffs

|-
| align="left" | 2014
| align="left" | Charlotte
| 1 || 0 || 3.0 || .000 || .000 || .000 || 2.0 || .0 || .0 || .0 || 0.0
|- class="sortbottom"
| style="text-align:left;"| Career
| style="text-align:left;"|
| 1 || 0 || 3.0 || .000 || .000 || .000 || 2.0 || .0 || .0 || .0 || 0.0

Family

He is now married to Brittany White and has 3 kids Avery White(7),Olivia White(1)and Timiya Waggoner(14)from his wife

References

External links

 NBA.com Profile
 
 Euroleague.net Profile
 Eurobasket.com Profile
 FIBA.com Profile
 D. J. White Indiana Hoosiers Biography
 

1986 births
Living people
20th-century African-American people
21st-century African-American sportspeople
African-American basketball players
All-American college men's basketball players
American expatriate basketball people in China
American expatriate basketball people in Italy
American expatriate basketball people in Spain
American expatriate basketball people in Turkey
American men's basketball players
Auxilium Pallacanestro Torino players
Bahçeşehir Koleji S.K. players
Basketball players at the 2007 Pan American Games
Basketball players from Alabama
Boston Celtics players
Charlotte Bobcats players
Detroit Pistons draft picks
Fujian Sturgeons players
Gaziantep Basketbol players
Indiana Hoosiers men's basketball players
Lega Basket Serie A players
Liga ACB players
McDonald's High School All-Americans
Oklahoma City Thunder players
Pan American Games competitors for the United States
Parade High School All-Americans (boys' basketball)
Power forwards (basketball)
Saski Baskonia players
Shanghai Sharks players
Sichuan Blue Whales players
Sportspeople from Tuscaloosa, Alabama
Tofaş S.K. players
Tulsa 66ers players